Abisara fylla, the dark Judy, is a small but striking butterfly found in India that belongs to the Punches and Judies, that is the family Riodinidae.

Description

From Charles Thomas Bingham (1905) The Fauna of British India, Including Ceylon and Burma, Butterflies Vol. 1:
Male upperside rich dark brown. Forewing with a cream-coloured even band from middle of costa to tornus, "bent slightly inwards at each end; a subterminal transverse, very obscure, pale fascia ending anteriorly in a white dot and two subapical white dots. Hindwing: postdiscal and subterminal very obscure pale transversa fasciae; the latter with a superposed series of seven oval black spots each with a white dot on the outer margin and inwardly pale-edged; the preapical two and posterior two of these spots only clearly defined, the others obsolescent, the preapieal two the larger. Underside duller brown; the markings as on the upperside; the hindwing with indications of a sub-basal pale fascia in addition to the others.  Antennae, head, thorax and abdomen dark brown; beneath the palpi, thorax and abdomen paler; antenna with a white dot at apex.

Female. Similar; the termen of the hindwing more distinctly but very broadly angulated outwards in the middle. Upperside: the ground colour paler duller brown, the oblique band on the forewing pure white, not cream-coloured; six (not seven) black spots in the subterminal series on the hindwing, the spots larger and more clearly defined than in the male. Underside: ground colour paler than on the upperside: markings similar; no trace of a subbasal band on the hindwing, the middle two spots of the subterminai series more or less obsolescent. Antennae, head, thorax and abdomen concolorous with the ground colour of the wings, a white spot at apex of the antennae; beneath, the palpi, thorax and abdomen paler, marked with white.
Expanse: 52–62 mm
Habitat: The Himalayas. Mussoorie to Sikkim; the hills of Assam, Burma and Tennaserim.

See also
Riodinidae
List of butterflies of India
List of butterflies of India (Riodinidae)

References

External links

Abisara
Butterflies of Asia